Bobby Hicks (born July 21, 1933) is a Grammy Award-winning American bluegrass fiddler and musician with more than fifty years of experience.

Career
Hicks was born in Newton, North Carolina and learned to play the fiddle before he was 9 years old. He attended several fiddlers conventions and at the age of eleven, he won the "North Carolina State Championship" playing the tune "Black Mountain Rag". He joined Jim Eanes band in the early fifties.

In 1953, he was, through the bluegrass festivals arranger Carlton Haney, hired as a bass player in Bill Monroe's Bluegrass Boys. He did not record with the Bluegrass Boys until December 31, 1954, by then he had switched to fiddle. During this period, he learned to play "Nashville swing" by the session fiddler Dale Potter, a style Hicks often used when playing with Bill Monroe on the road. Monroe dubbed Hicks "the truest fiddler he had ever heard". He recorded seven tunes with Monroe but had to quit in 1956 to join the army. In 1958, after his discharge, he rejoined the Bluegrass Boys, recording ten more songs. He left in 1959 to join Porter Wagoner. Later in 1963, he moved to Las Vegas, Nevada and became a fixture on the Judy Lynn Show for the next seven years. In 1981, he joined Ricky Skaggs, a stint that would last for 23 years.

In the mid and late 1980s, he frequently performed with Bill Monroe on stage and on records. He was inducted into the "Fiddlers Hall of Fame" in 2002. He appeared as a member of "Jesse McReynolds and the Virginia Boys" in 2003. The next year, he performed with "Hazel Creek".

In 2004, he celebrated 50 years at the Grand Ole Opry. Bobby Hicks is a 10 time Grammy winner. His discography includes over 50 albums.

References
 ''Neil V.Rosenberg, Charles K. Wolfe, Bluegrass, Bill Monroe, Bear Family Publication, 1989.

External links
 Bobby Hicks Teaches Fiddling, Vol. 1

1933 births
Living people
People from Newton, North Carolina
American bluegrass fiddlers
Country musicians from North Carolina
21st-century violinists
Bluegrass Album Band members
Kentucky Thunder members